Nielsine Petersen (10 July 1851 – 26 November 1916) was a Danish sculptor.

Biography
Nielsine Caroline Petersen was born at Nyrup in the parish Højby on the island of Zealand, Denmark. She was the daughter of Mads Petersen (1875-1884) and Kirstine born Madsen (1826-c. 1885). She came to Copenhagen and visited Vilhelm Kyhn's drawing school, after which she became a student of August Saabye. She exhibited for the first time at the Charlottenborg Spring Exhibition in 1880 and won the Neuhausen Prize in 1883. In 1889 she received the Academy's travel scholarship and then studied in Paris.

In 1893 she won the Eibeschütz Prize for the statue Ismail. She was awarded the Ingenio et arti medal in 1908. In 1901 she was invited on an eleven day visit to Buckingham Palace by King Edward VII and Queen Alexandra of Denmark. She received a number of foreign honours, including the French Ordre des Palmes académiques, the Russian Medal of Merit and the British Order of Merit for Art and Science.

She is remembered in particular for her bronze statue of Hamlet and for En dreng, der fisker krabber (1884) featuring a child fishing crabs.

She initially had a studio on Bredgade in Copenhagen and then in a villa on Hultmannsvej in Hellerup. She died during 1916 and was buried at Hellerup Cemetery.

References

1853 births
1916 deaths
19th-century Danish women artists
20th-century Danish women artists
20th-century Danish artists
19th-century Danish sculptors
20th-century Danish sculptors
People from Odsherred Municipality
Recipients of Ingenio et Arti
Burials at Hellerup Cemetery